Elchonon Bunim Wasserman (18756 July 1941) was a prominent rabbi and rosh yeshiva (dean) in prewar Europe. He was one of the closest students of Yisrael Meir Kagan (the Chofetz Chaim) and a noted Talmid Chacham. In the interwar period, he served as rosh yeshiva of Yeshiva Ohel Torah-Baranovich. He was murdered during the Holocaust.

Early life and education 
Elchonon Bunim Wasserman was born in 1874 in Biržai (Birz) in present-day Lithuania to Naftali Beinish, a shopkeeper and Sheina Rakhel. In 1890, the family moved to Bauska (Boisk) in present-day Latvia, and Wasserman, then 15 years old, studied in the Telshe Yeshiva in Telšiai (Telz) under Eliezer Gordon and Shimon Shkop. When Wasserman returned home during vacation, he participated in classes given by Abraham Isaac Kook, who was appointed rabbi of Bauska in 1895. In the summer of 1897, Wasserman met Chaim Soloveitchik at a health resort and "became deeply attached to him and his way of learning." He left Telz and traveled to Brest-Litovsk (Brisk) in present-day Belarus, where he learned under Soloveitchik for two years, thereafter considering him his primary rebbe (teacher and mentor).

Wasserman was married in 1899 to Michla, the daughter of Meir Atlas, rabbi of Salantai (Salant). Wasserman lived in his father-in-law's house for many years and rejected offers of rabbinical posts (including a prestigious rabbinate in Moscow) being afforded the opportunity to learn Torah at home. He did however decide to teach, and together with Yoel Baranchik, he started a mesivta (high school) in Mstislavl (known to Jews as Amtchislav) in 1903 and earned himself a reputation as an outstanding teacher. Prior to 1907, Wasserman heard that another local rabbi wanted to head the mesivta in Amtshilov and he left to avoid an argument, returning to learn in his father-in-law's house. From 1907 to 1910, he studied in the Kollel Kodshim in the Raduń Yeshiva in Radun (Radin), headed by Yisrael Meir Kagan. While at the kollel, Wasserman studied for eighteen hours a day with Yosef Shlomo Kahaneman, who would later become the rosh yeshiva (dean) of the Ponevezh Yeshiva.

Rosh yeshiva 
In 1910, with the encouragement of Kagan, Wasserman was appointed rosh yeshiva of the mesivta in Brest-Litovsk, leading its expansion until it was disbanded in 1914 with the outbreak of World War I. With its closing, Wasserman returned to Kagan in Radin. When the Eastern Front reached Radin, however, the yeshiva there was closed, and Wasserman fled to Russia with Kagan.

In 1914, the yeshiva was exiled to Smilavičy, near Minsk, and Wasserman was appointed its rosh yeshiva one year later when Kagan decided to relocate to Siemiatycze (Semiatitch). Together with Yitzchok Hirshowitz (son-in-law of Eliezer Gordon from Telz Yeshiva), Wasserman was asked to keep Torah alive in Smilavičy.

In 1921, after the war, the Soviet government began permitting Torah scholars to leave Russia. Wasserman moved to Baranovichi, Second Polish Republic (now in Belarus), where he took the lead of Yeshiva Ohel Torah-Baranovich. The yeshiva grew under Wasserman's supervision, and soon had close to 300 students. Copies of notes taken from Wasserman's Torah lectures were passed around many of the yeshivas in Europe, increasing his influence and fame over most of the Torah world. He was one of the leaders of the Agudath Israel movement and was regarded as the spiritual successor of Kagan.

Trip to America 
Towards the end of 1937, Wasserman traveled to the United States for 17 months in order to raise money for the yeshiva. He visited dozens of cities and towns, and raised around $10,000. While he was there, he made an impression on many young Jews.

Wasserman returned to Poland, although he knew his life was in danger by doing so. This was partly because he did not want to abandon his students, and partly because he took a dim view of American Jewry. In 1939, just before the Nazi invasion, he advised a student against accepting a visa to the United States if it meant studying at Yeshiva University and what is now the Hebrew Theological College, due to what he perceived as a spiritually dangerous atmosphere in these two institutions. He suggested instead that the student consider Yeshiva Torah Vodaas in Brooklyn, New York.

Death in the Holocaust

When World War II broke out, Wasserman fled to Vilnius (Vilna). In 1941, while on a visit to Kaunas (Kovno), he was arrested by Lithuanian Nazi sympathizers with twelve other rabbis.

Wasserman was taken and murdered by Lithuanian collaborators on the 12th of Tammuz, 1941, in the Seventh Fort of Kaunas Fortress. Before he was taken he gave this statement:
"In Heaven it appears that they deem us to be righteous because our bodies have been chosen to atone for the Jewish people. Therefore, we must repent now, immediately. There is not much time. We must keep in mind that we will be better offerings if we repent. In this way we will save the lives of our brethren overseas. Let no thought enter our minds, God forbid, which is abominable and which renders an offering unfit. We are now fulfilling the greatest mitzvah. With fire she [Jerusalem] was destroyed and with fire she will be rebuilt. The very fire which consumes our bodies will one day rebuild the Jewish people".

There was no monument, only a marker to the pit where, with others, he was shot.

Family 
Wasserman had several sons. Elazar Simcha (1899-1992), his oldest, served as dean of Yeshiva Beth Yehudah in Detroit in the 1940s, founded Yeshiva Ohr Elchonon (later renamed Yeshiva Ohr Elchonon Chabad/West Coast Talmudical Seminary) in Los Angeles, California, in the 1950s, and later founded Yeshiva Ohr Elchonon in Jerusalem. Wasserman's son David survived the Holocaust, remarried and relocated to Brooklyn. Wasserman's other son Naftoli was murdered in the Holocaust.

Anti-Zionism 
Wasserman was an opponent of Zionism. He based his opinion upon the Torah views of his teachers, including Kagan, Gordon, Shkop and Soloveitchik. He considered all forms of Zionism to be heretical, even that of the religious  Mizrachi party. He was opposed to the idea of a Jewish state because it constituted kefirah (rejection) of the coming of Moshiach (the Messiah). He held this position even in reference to a state run according to Torah law. He declared that any religious Jew who collaborated with the Zionists was causing others to sin. He rejected the notion that the creation of a state was a signal to the Atchalta De'Geulah (beginning of the Jewish redemption), considering it instead to be the beginning of a new galus (exile).

Even during the Holocaust, Wasserman discouraged emigration to the United States or Palestine, viewing them as places of spiritual danger. He was particularity critical of the Zionist enterprise in Palestine and claimed, "Anti-Semites want to kill the body, but Zionists kill the soul. Better to die than consort with the Zionists."

Wasserman viewed the two ascendant political movements of his time, nationalism and socialism, as "two forms of idolatry that had poisoned the hearts and minds of Jewish youth", and saw Nazism as an amalgam of both. He viewed the rise of the Nazi Party as a tool of God to exact punishment on the Jewish people for their pursuit of these foreign belief systems.

Notable students 
 Aryeh Leib Baron
 Shmuel Berenbaum
 Henoch Fishman
 Tovia Goldstein
 Shneur Kotler
 Aryeh Leib Malin
 Nochum Partzovitz
 Dovid Povarsky
 Moshe Schwab
 Moshe Shmuel Shapiro
 Simcha Sheps
 Boruch Sorotzkin
 Simcha Wasserman

Works 
Wasserman was famous for his clear, penetrating Talmudic analysis. His popular works, essential material in yeshivas around the world, are unique in their approach. He would often quote his rebbe, Chaim Soloveitchik, saying "Producing chiddushim (novel Torah concepts) is not for us. That was only in the power of the Rishonim. Our task is to understand what it says." This approach is evident in his works, which include:
Kovetz Heoros
Kovetz Shiurim
Kovetz Biyurim
Kovetz Shemuos
Kovetz Inyanim
Kovetz Maamarim
Ikvasa Demeshicha

Wasserman also published the responsa of the Rashba with annotations in 1932. His talmudic novellae appeared in the rabbinic journal Sha'arei Tzion (1929–1934) and in other publications.

References

1874 births
1941 deaths
20th-century Lithuanian writers
20th-century Lithuanian rabbis
Authors of works on the Talmud
Haredi rabbis in Europe
Jewish martyrs
Lithuanian male writers
Lithuanian Haredi rabbis
Rosh yeshivas
Raduń Yeshiva alumni
People from Biržai
The Holocaust in Lithuania
Anti-Zionist Haredi rabbis
1941 murders in Europe